P'aqu Urqu (Quechua p'aqu blond, fair, a color similar to gold, urqu mountain, "'blond' or slightly golden mountain", Hispanicized spelling Paco Orkho) is a  mountain in the Andes of Bolivia. It is located in the Potosí Department, Sud Lípez Province, San Pablo de Lípez Municipality, southwest of San Pablo de Lípez. P'aqu Urqu lies between the mountains Yuraq Urqu and Yana Urqu in the northwest and Waqrayuq in the southeast.

A little river named Ñañu Mayu ("slim river", Nanu Mayu) originates northeast of the mountain. It flows to the west.

References 

Mountains of Potosí Department